In abstract algebra, alternativity is a property of a binary operation.  A magma G is said to be  if  for all  and  if  for all  A magma that is both left and right alternative is said to be .

Any associative magma (that is, a semigroup) is alternative. More generally, a magma in which every pair of elements generates an associative submagma must be alternative. The converse, however, is not true, in contrast to the situation in alternative algebras. In fact, an alternative magma need not even be power-associative.

References

Properties of binary operations